678th Air Defense Artillery Brigade is an air defense artillery brigade of the United States Army, South Carolina Army National Guard. The 678th ADA Brigade is the only integrated fires brigade in the Army’s inventory.

Subordinate units
 2nd Battalion, 263rd Air Defense Artillery Regiment (2-263rd ADAR)
 1st Battalion, 178th Field Artillery Regiment (1-178th FA)

List of Commanders

References

External links 
 678th ADA Brigade's Facebook page

678
Military units and formations in South Carolina
Military units and formations established in 2016